William Lange (born February 11, 1972) is an American college basketball coach, currently the men's head coach at Saint Joseph's University. He was previously an assistant head coach with the Philadelphia 76ers. Prior to joining the 76ers, he was the associate head coach at Villanova University and head coach of the Navy Midshipmen.

High school
Born in Haddon Heights, New Jersey, Lange played high school basketball at Bishop Eustace Preparatory School in Pennsauken Township, New Jersey and then played collegiately at Rowan University. He started his coaching career with a single season at his alma mater, Bishop Eustace, replacing his father in the role.

Coaching career
In 1996, Lange began his collegiate coaching career as an assistant under Naismith Basketball Hall of Fame coach Herb Magee at Philadelphia University. After two seasons with Magee, Lange moved on to Division I ball, going crosstown and earning an assistant coaching job at La Salle University in 1998. While at La Salle, Lange helped the Explorers earn a 13–15 record during the 1998–99 season before being offered the head job at the United States Merchant Marine Academy in Kings Point, New York.

Lange's first two years of collegiate head coaching were extremely successful. In his first season, Lange guided his Mariners to a 1999–2000 Skyline Conference regular season title and came up a game short in making the Division III NCAA Tournament, losing in the Skyline Conference tournament. However, the squad earned a record of 17–11, including a 13–3 mark in conference. Lange's second year at USMMA, however, would prove to be historic, as his team compiled a 22–8 record, including 15–1 in-conference. The 2000–01 Mariners won both the regular season and conference tournament championships, and made it all the way to the Division III Sweet 16, the first time a USMMA team had ever advanced beyond the first round of the tournament.

Lange returned to Division I ball when he accepted an assistant coaching position at Villanova University. From 2001 to 2004, Billy worked under Jay Wright, while the Villanova Wildcasts enjoyed great success.

Lange earned his first Division I head coaching assignment in 2004 as he became the coach at the United States Naval Academy in Annapolis, Maryland. Lange inherited a team that had gone only 5–23 the previous year. His teams showed improvement on the court, including a 16–14 record in 2007–08, the school's first winning season in seven years and a 19–11 mark in 2008–09.

Lange left his post at Navy to rejoin Wright as his associate head coach on May 9, 2011. After two seasons at Villanova, Lange was hired by the Philadelphia 76ers as a player development coach for the 2013–14 season. Prior to joining Brett Brown's staff, Lange reportedly turned down a head coaching opportunity with the Rio Grande Valley Vipers, the NBA Development League, or D-League, affiliate of the Houston Rockets.

While with the Sixers, Lange elevated into a lead assistant with roles that included player development and coordinating the team's offense. Lange left his position with the 76ers to be the men's basketball head coach at Saint Joseph's University on March 28, 2019. He was hired to replace Phil Martelli after 24 years at head coach of Saint Joseph's.

Personal life
Lange has a wife, Alicia, and four sons, Will, Matt, Marc, and Jake. He is the son of Bill Lange, Sr., a retired history teacher and  head boys' basketball coach for Lenape High School in Mount Laurel, New Jersey.

Head coaching record

References

1972 births
Living people
American men's basketball coaches
American men's basketball players
Basketball coaches from New Jersey
Basketball players from New Jersey
Bishop Eustace Preparatory School alumni
College men's basketball head coaches in the United States
High school basketball coaches in the United States
La Salle Explorers men's basketball coaches
Merchant Marine Mariners men's basketball coaches
Navy Midshipmen men's basketball coaches
People from Haddon Heights, New Jersey
Philadelphia 76ers assistant coaches
Philadelphia Rams men's basketball coaches
Rowan Profs men's basketball players
Saint Joseph's Hawks men's basketball coaches
Sportspeople from the Delaware Valley
Villanova Wildcats men's basketball coaches